K. T. S. Sarao or Karam Tej Singh Sarao (Hindi: कर्म तेज सिंह सराओ; Punjabi: ਕਰਮ ਤੇਜ ਸਿੰਘ ਸਰਾਓ; born 1 April 1955) is the former head and professor of Buddhist Studies at the University of Delhi. Sarao has been a visiting professor/fellow at Dongguk University, Chung-Hwa Institute of Buddhist Studies, Preah Sihanouk Raja Buddhist University, St Edmund's College, Cambridge, Maison des Sciences de L'Homme, University of Toronto, and Visva-Bharati University.

Early life, family and education
He was born in village Chatha Gobindpura, Sangrur and received his high school certificate from Khanauri High School. Later, after having attended D.A.V. College, Chandigarh for one year, he went to Delhi University from where he obtained a bachelor's honours degree in history with economics, a first-class-first master’s in history, and a PhD in Buddhism. In 1985, he went to Cambridge University as a Commonwealth scholar and received his second doctorate in Pāli and archaeology under the supervision of Raymond Allchin and K. R. Norman in 1989.  Between the years 1981 and 1993, he also worked part-time for India’s Ministry of Defence as National Cadet Corps officer in the rank of captain.

Bibliography

Books

Journals

See also
 Romila Thapar

References

20th-century Indian historians
Living people
1955 births
Delhi University alumni
Alumni of the University of Cambridge
Academic staff of Delhi University
21st-century Indian historians